Helmut Riegler (born October 13, 1976) is an Austria international retired footballer who played for clubs including Union St. Florian.

References

1976 births
Living people
Austrian footballers
Austria international footballers
ASKÖ Pasching players
LASK players
Union St. Florian players
SKU Amstetten players

Association football defenders